Rudolf Maschke was a luger who competed for Czechoslovakia before World War II and for West Germany after World War II. He won five medals at the European luge championships with one gold (Men's singles: 1952), two silvers (Men's singles and men's doubles: both 1934), and two bronzes (Men's doubles: 1937, 1938).

References
List of European luge champions 

Czechoslovak male lugers
German male lugers
Year of birth missing
Year of death missing
German Bohemian people
Sudeten German people